A statue of Christopher Columbus is installed in Baton Rouge, Louisiana, United States.

See also
 List of monuments and memorials to Christopher Columbus

References

Buildings and structures in Baton Rouge, Louisiana
Monuments and memorials in Louisiana
Monuments and memorials to Christopher Columbus
Outdoor sculptures in Louisiana
Sculptures of men in Louisiana
Statues in Louisiana
Baton Rouge, Louisiana